Gran Turismo 3: A-Spec is a 2001 racing game, the first in the Gran Turismo series released for the PlayStation 2. During its demonstration at E3 2000 and E3 2001 the game's working title was Gran Turismo 2000. 

Like its predecessors, the game opened to critical acclaim and was commercial success and went on to become the best-selling game in the series to date, as well as the second best-selling PlayStation 2 game and is the best-selling PlayStation 2 exclusive with the game selling 14 million copies since release. It has been considered to be one of the greatest video games of all time.

Gameplay
The objective of the game is to win all the provided races, championships, complete license tests and achieve 100% game completion. Every 25% of the game completed results in the player being awarded a car as a special prize. For GT3, the Gran Turismo Mode (Simulation Mode in the North American version) has a reorganized layout, with a more structured and progressive arrangement of races and challenges. Races vary from short beginner events to multi-hour endurance races and also rallying events against an opponent. In addition to these modes, car shops are now organized by country and then by manufacturer.

The Arcade Mode is reorganized in "stages"; these stages are made up of 5 or 6 tracks pooled from all available tracks in the game, including both road and rally races. To get to the next stage, all tracks on a stage must be completed on Easy difficulty or higher. By beating the stage on Normal or Difficult, additional cars are unlocked as well for play in any mode of Arcade Mode (including two-player battle and time trial).

GT3 features 19 race courses, 14 of which have reverse variants and 4 of which are dirt tracks. Most of these circuits are at fictional locations, but California's Laguna Seca Raceway and Côte d’Azur (which is heavily based on the Monaco Grand Prix circuit) are not.

Other changes include the omission of the ability to "race modify" or add downforce to production cars, removal of suspension damage, and the absence of torque limits for races.

New to the franchise, GT3 also contained unlicensed versions of six actual Formula One cars, labelled as F686/M, F687/S, F688/S, F090/S, F094/H and F094/S (in the Japanese and American versions) that the player could win from endurance races. In the Japanese and American versions, the name of each car denotes various pieces of information (such as the amount of cylinders in the engine, the year the chassis was raced, and its driver, respectively). For example, the aforementioned F094/S was the 10-cylinder, 1994-season car driven by Ayrton Senna, whereas the F686/M represented the 6-cylinder, 1986-season car driven by Nigel Mansell. In the PAL release, however, there were only two F1 cars, not obviously based on any real-life counterparts and instead labelled as Polyphony 001 and 002 respectively.

GT3 also marks informal appearances of automakers Lamborghini and Porsche. A racing JGTC Lamborghini Diablo was featured in the NTSC-J version (where the car has been cut from NTSC-U copy and being available in NTSC-U copy with a cheat device), and a Porsche 911 GT3 can be found in the game code (though it cannot be obtained normally, and requires the use of a cheat device). Both cars, together with two hidden Lancia Stratoses (road and rally versions), however, are completely absent in PAL version. Lamborghini would make its first official appearance in 2009's Gran Turismo for PlayStation Portable, while Porsche made its first official appearance in Gran Turismo Sport for the PlayStation 4.

Development and release

The game was developed by Kazunori Yamauchi, who had developed the first two games. Yamauchi collaborated with computer and game peripheral maker Logitech for the game, which resulted in the GT Force steering wheel. The wheel features force feedback and was designed specifically for GT3.

A demo copy of the game under the working title was issued in the PlayStation Festival 2000, allowing players to drive a Mitsubishi Lancer Evolution V in the Seattle Circuit for 120 seconds. The game was more or less a beta version of GT3 named Gran Turismo 2000, that was renamed to GT3 A-Spec due to the fact the game was taking longer to make than planned.

Compared to Gran Turismo 2, the graphics are greatly improved thanks to the PlayStation 2's hardware, but the number of cars has been drastically reduced in this game due to large work onto graphics, cars structure, detailed statistics of all the cars and the game's release being early in the PlayStation 2's lifespan. About 180 cars are featured in this game, rather than 650 in GT2.

A giveaway launched at the release of the game included various prizes in North America; for example, there was a day at the Skip Barber Racing School, car payments for a month and Gran Turismo themed shirt and hat up for giveaway.

Gran Turismo Concept

Due to its critically acclaimed reception, a short version, Gran Turismo Concept, was released in Japan and various parts of the world except North America in 2001 and 2002. It included new models unveiled during famous Asian and European Motor Shows. Upon completing the game, the player was given a save game with all licenses completed and 10,000,000 credits for Gran Turismo 3.

Reception

Gran Turismo 3: A-Spec received "universal acclaim" like its predecessors according to review aggregator Metacritic. Reviewers lauded its graphics, realism, soundtrack, sound design and controls. Frank O'Connor of NextGen called it "The best, most complete, and most impressive driving game so far, lapping its predecessors handily – and the first must-have for PlayStation 2." In Japan, Famitsu gave it a near-perfect score of 39 out of 40.

Sales
In Japan, the game sold 1 million units in its first three days of release. In North America, it shipped  units in its first day and became the fastest-selling software launch in the region. By July 2006, it had sold 3.8 million units and earned  in the U.S. alone. NextGen ranked it as the third highest-selling game launched for the PlayStation 2, Xbox or GameCube between January 2000 and July 2006 in that country. In the United Kingdom, the game received a "Double Platinum" sales award from the Entertainment and Leisure Software Publishers Association (ELSPA), indicating sales of at least 600,000 units in the UK. In Europe, the game  in 2001, adding up to at least more than  grossed in the United States (by 2006) and Europe (in 2001).

As of April 30, 2008, the game has shipped 1.89 million units in Japan, 7.14 million in North America, 5.85 million in Europe, and 10,000 in Southeast Asia, for a total of 14.89 million copies. It is the highest-selling game in the Gran Turismo franchise. It is a part of the PlayStation 2's Greatest Hits. It ranked fifteenth in the list of best-selling unbundled console games of all time, just below Wii Fit Plus.

Awards
GameSpot named it the fifth-best console game of 2001, and presented it with a "Best Driving Game" award among console games. It was a runner-up in the "Best PlayStation 2 Game", "Best Sound" and "Best Graphics, Technical" categories. The game won the award for "Console Racing" at the Academy of Interactive Arts & Sciences' 5th Annual Interactive Achievement Awards, and was a runner-up for the "Console Game of the Year" award, which went to Halo: Combat Evolved.

Legacy
The game has appeared on some 'Top 100 Games' lists such as that by IGN in 2003. In 2004, readers of Retro Gamer voted Gran Turismo 2 97th top retro gamer, with the staff noting that "the mix of realistic handling and superb graphics, not to mention the fact that it features hundreds of licensed vehicles, has won it the admiration of car lovers everywhere. The gameplay may be a little too deep and difficult for many, but for its core followers, Gran Turismo is the be all and end all of digital racing, and GT3 has been voted as the best of the bunch".

References

External links
 
 Gran Turismo 3: A-Spec Microsite 
 

2001 video games
Gran Turismo (series)
PlayStation 2 games
PlayStation 2-only games
Racing simulators
Rally racing video games
Sony Interactive Entertainment games
Split-screen multiplayer games
Interactive Achievement Award winners
Video games developed in Japan
Video games scored by Daiki Kasho
Video games set in California
Video games set in French Polynesia
Video games set in Monaco
Video games set in Rome
Video games set in Seattle
Video games set in Switzerland
Video games set in Tokyo
Video game sequels
Esports games
BAFTA Interactive Entertainment Award for Best Games winners
D.I.C.E. Award for Racing Game of the Year winners